Online Pro Wrestling is a professional wrestling video game released on the PlayStation 2 console by Yuke's in Japan. It is based on the WWE SmackDown! video game series based on the professional wrestling promotion World Wrestling Entertainment (WWE).

Features
The game introduced a more traditional grappling system while retaining the series’ fast gameplay. This new grappling system also includes body damage meters, individual character scales consisting of stats such as strength, endurance and speed, and submission meters for both the person applying the move and the person breaking out of the move.

It was based as an online game where people could fight each other online in virtual tournaments, single matches, and tag matches.

External links
Community
Online Pro Wrestling at IGN
Online Pro Wrestling at GameSpot
Online Pro Wrestling at GameFAQs

2004 video games
Japan-exclusive video games
Multiplayer and single-player video games
PlayStation 2 games
PlayStation 2-only games
Professional wrestling games
Video games developed in Japan
Yuke's games